Hòa Vang is a rural district (huyện) of Da Nang in the South Central Coast region of Vietnam. It is bordered by Liên Chiểu and Cẩm Lệ districts to the east, Thừa Thiên-Huế province to the north and northwest, and Quảng Nam province to the west and south.

Administration
As of 2003 the district had a population of 106,746. The district covers an area of 708 km².

Hòa Vang district is subdivided into 11 rural communes (xã):
Hòa Bắc
Hòa Liên
Hòa Ninh
Hòa Sơn
Hòa Nhơn
Hòa Phong
Hòa Phú
Hòa Khương
Hòa Châu
Hòa Phước
Hòa Tiến
The district capital lies at Hòa Phong commune.

References

Districts of Da Nang